The Battle of Norada was a battle of Japan's Sengoku period, fought between forces under Azai Nagamasa and Rokkaku Yoshikata in the year 1560.

Azai Nagamasa had previously been a retainer under the Rokkaku clan, and sought independence from the Rokkaku; Rokkaku Yoshikata meanwhile sought to consolidate his power through subjugation of the Azai. Rokkaku Yoshikata's force numbered 25,000 and outnumbered Azai Nagamasa's force by over two to one as it counted only 11,000. Both sides arrived on the battlefield unimpeded and even before engaging, Rokkaku troops defeated the army of Dodo Kuranosuke. After that easy skirmish, they believed they had already won the battle. Highly motivated under Nagamasa, his troops charged unintimidated and in the chaos of the battle, the Rokkaku force collapsed and retreated under heavy losses.

The Azai clan ousted their defunct leader Azai Hisamasa, replacing him with Nagamasa. The Rokkaku clan fell into disarray with retainers questioning Yoshikata's rule; his strength weakened never to recover to its height.

1560 in Japan
Norada 1560
Norada
Norada
Azai clan